Carl Johan Henrik Forssell (born 8 December 1979) is a Swedish politician of the Moderate Party. He has served as Minister of Foreign Trade and Minister for International Development Cooperation in the cabinet of Ulf Kristersson since 18 October 2022 and has been Member of the Riksdag since the 2010 general election, representing Stockholm Municipality. He was chairman of the Moderate Youth League, the youth wing of the Moderate Party, from 2004 to 2006.

Personal life and education 
Johan Forssell was born in Stockholm but he grew up in Örebro. He has a Master of Business and Economics degree from the Stockholm School of Economics. He did his military service with the Arctic Rangers at K 4 in Arvidsjaur.

Political career 
Forssell joined the Moderate Youth League in 1992. He served as chairman of the Moderate School Youth from 1998 to 1999 and was elected as member of the board of the Moderate Youth League in 2000. He was elected as new chairman of the Moderate Youth League on 20 November 2004, following the resignation of Christofer Fjellner. He served on this post until 25 November 2006, when he was succeeded by Niklas Wykman.

In the general election held on 17 September 2006, Forssell was elected a member of the Riksdag. As the new cabinet was announced on 6 October, Forssell was appointed as Chief of Staff to Prime Minister Fredrik Reinfeldt. He left his place in the Riksdag following his new appointment.

In September 2007, he resigned from the position of Chief of Staff and become the Moderate Partys planning manager for the 2010 general election. Following the 2010 election, he returned to the Swedish Parliament where he serves as member of the Defence Committee.

Trivia 
Forssell was voted the "sexiest man in Sweden" in 2005, by the LGBT-magazine QX.

References

 

 

 

1979 births
Living people
Members of the Riksdag 2006–2010
Members of the Riksdag 2010–2014
Members of the Riksdag 2014–2018
Members of the Riksdag 2018–2022
Members of the Riksdag 2022–2026
Members of the Riksdag from the Moderate Party
Stockholm School of Economics alumni
Swedish bloggers
Swedish Ministers for Trade
Swedish Ministers for International Development Cooperation